Instress is the apprehension of an object in an intense thrust of energy toward it that enables one to realize specific distinctiveness. It may also refer to:

Instress (publisher), a publisher of poetry
Instress, the annual literary magazine published by Misericordia University